Heather A. Conley is president of the German Marshall Fund of the United States (GMF) in Washington, D.C.

Early life and education

Conley received her Bachelor of Arts degree from West Virginia Wesleyan College. She received her Master of Arts in International Relations from the Paul H. Nitze School of Advanced International Studies, The Johns Hopkins University.

Career

Conley is an expert on Russia and the post-Soviet space as well as geopolitics of the Arctic, Baltic and Central Europe. After graduation, Conley served for over three years in several capacities as a foreign affairs officer in the Department of State. She served as an associate with the international consulting firm Armitage Associates, L.C. since 1994 and as a senior associate since 1997.

Conley served as the State Department as Deputy Assistant Secretary of State, responsible for Central Europe - a role she assumed in September 2001 and held until 2005. During her tenure as a top diplomat for Central Europe, NATO underwent its fifth, and most significant enlargement round in 2004. Many countries in Central Europe also joined the Bush Administration's multinational "Coalition of the Willing" force during the 2003 Iraq invasion. Conley has subsequently stated that the US has lost some credibility as a result of the Iraq War.

In 2009, she moved to the Center for Strategic & International Studies as director and senior fellow in charge of the Europe Program.  In 2014 she was promoted to senior vice president for Europe, Eurasia, and the Arctic and director of the CSIS Europe Program.

In November, 2021, she was appointed to succeed Karen Donfried as president of the German Marshall Fund, commencing in January 2022.  The GMF is a nonpartisan American public policy think tank and grant-making institution dedicated to promoting cooperation and understanding between North America and Europe.

In 2022, she will take up the role of Sol M. Linowitz Professor of International Affairs at Hamilton College, with concentration on the role that alliances to U.S. national security have played since the Second World War.

Board appointments

Conley is a member of the board of directors of the American Ditchley Foundation.

Opposition to Donald Trump

In 2020, Conley, along with over 130 other former Republican national security officials, signed a statement that asserted that President Trump was unfit to serve another term, and "To that end, we are firmly convinced that it is in the best interest of our nation that Vice President Joe Biden be elected as the next President of the United States, and we will vote for him."

Recognition
She has received two State Department Meritorious Honor Awards.

Works

References 

Living people
West Virginia Wesleyan College alumni
Paul H. Nitze School of Advanced International Studies alumni
Year of birth missing (living people)
21st-century American women